The International Conference on Integrated Power Electronics Systems (CIPS) is biennially held in the city of Nuremberg, Germany. The conference has its origin in the Power Electronics Specialists Conference (PESC) and first took place in 2000. Since 2004, conference papers are available through IEEE Xplore. The conference grows continually: in 2014 292 engineers and scientists attended the conference, 24% more than 2012.
 
CIPS focuses on the following main aspects:

 electronic packaging technologies 
 hybrid systems and high Power density integration 
 reliability of systems and components 
 mechatronic integration
 reduction of parasitic elements in power modules

Technology conferences